Păunești is a commune located in Vrancea County, Romania. It is composed of two villages, Păunești and Viișoara.

References

Communes in Vrancea County
Localities in Western Moldavia